Rachid Kisri (born 1 March 1975) is a Moroccan long-distance runner. At the 2012 Summer Olympics, he competed in the Men's marathon, finishing in 18th place.

References

External links
 
 
 
 

Moroccan male long-distance runners
Moroccan male marathon runners
1975 births
Living people
Olympic athletes of Morocco
Athletes (track and field) at the 2012 Summer Olympics
Place of birth missing (living people)
World Athletics Championships athletes for Morocco
20th-century Moroccan people
21st-century Moroccan people